Ballantine and Gardiner was a Scottish manufacturer of stained-glass windows, one of several names the company worked under.James Ballantine and Son (about 1828 - about 1925) – Stained Glass in Wales

The business was founded in Edinburgh by James Ballantine (1806–1877) and George Allan as Ballantine and Allan. They began making stained glass in the 1830s.

In 1843, they won a competition to design windows for the new Houses of Parliament, although it was subsequently changed to that of the House of Lords.

James' son, Alexander (1841–1906), joined the business, which thence became known as Ballantine and Son until 1905. Herbert Gardiner joined in 1905. Alexander's son, James Ballantine III, also joined in 1905, a year before his father's death.

Some of the firm's work was signed with the alternative spelling of Ballantyne.

Selected notable works

The company installed the windows of the following buildings:

Glenormiston House, Innerleithen, 1851
Sandyford Henderson Church, Glasgow, 1857
St Serf's Church, Dunning, c. 1900
House of Lords, London
Hamilton Old Parish Church - a window representing Jesus, Martha and Mary that was fitted in 1876
Main hall of Dunoon Burgh Hall, (with the subject possibly being the building's architect Robert Alexander Bryden)
St John's Kirk, Perth
St Cuthbert's Church, Edinburgh

References

Further reading
Rona H. Moody, 200 Scottish Stained Glass Artists, The Journal of Stained Glass, vol. xxx (2006), p. 166–7.
Glass Painters 1750–1850, Journal of the British Society of Master Glass-Painters, vol. xiii, no. 1 (1959–60), p. 327.
Joyce Little, Stained Glass Marks and Monograms (London: National Association of Decorative and Fine Art Societies, 2002), p. 8

Scottish stained glass artists and manufacturers
1830s establishments in Scotland
Manufacturing companies based in Edinburgh